Mary Field (born Olivia Rockefeller; June 10, 1909 – June 12, 1996) was an American film actress who primarily appeared in supporting roles.

Early life 
She was born in New York City. As a child, she never knew her biological parents; during her infancy, she was left outside the doors of a church with a note pinned to her saying that her name was Olivia Rockefeller. She was later adopted. She attended the Brentwood Hall School in Westchester County, New York.

Hollywood and television 
In 1937, she was signed under contract to Warner Bros. Studios and made her film debut in The Prince and the Pauper which was released during the year. Her other screen credits include parts in such films as Jezebel (1938), Cowboy from Brooklyn (1938), The Amazing Dr. Clitterhouse (1938), Eternally Yours (1939), When Tomorrow Comes (1939), Broadway Melody of 1940, Ball of Fire (1941), How Green Was My Valley (1941), Shadows on the Stairs (1941), Mrs. Miniver (1942), Ministry of Fear (1944), Song of the South (1946), Out of the Past (1947), Miracle on 34th Street (1947), and Life With Father (1947). During her time in Hollywood she appeared in approximately 103 films.

Her TV credits include parts in Gunsmoke (in 1960 as an abused wife in S5E19’s “Till Death Do Us Part”, Wagon Train, Mr. Adams and Eve, and The Loretta Young Show. In 1963, her last acting role was as a Roman Catholic nun in the television series, Going My Way, starring Gene Kelly and modeled after the 1944 Bing Crosby film of the same name. She appeared in several episodes of the television comedy, Topper, as Henrietta Topper's friend Thelma Gibney.

Personal life 
In the 1940s, Field was married to Allan Douglas, a member of the Army Medical Corps. Following her 1963 retirement she was still married to her husband James Madison Walters and lived in Laguna Niguel, California. She also devoted her time to family and was active in the Hollywood Church of Religious Science.

Death 
On June 12, 1996, two days after her 87th birthday, Mary Field died at her home in Fairfax, Virginia, of complications from a stroke. She lived there with her daughter, Susana Kerstein, and son-in-law, Bob Kerstein.  She had two grandchildren, Sky Kerstein and Kendall Kerstein. She was cremated and her ashes returned to her family.

Complete filmography

Call It a Day (1937) as Elsie Lester, Roger's Secretary (uncredited)
The Prince and the Pauper (1937) as Mrs. Canty
Hoosier Schoolboy (1937) as School Board Secretary
White Banners (1938) as Hester
Jezebel (1938) as Woman at the Olympus Ball (uncredited)
Cowboy from Brooklyn (1938) as Myrtle Semple (Elly's secretary)
The Amazing Dr. Clitterhouse (1938) as Millie - Mrs. Updyke's Maid (uncredited)
Youth Takes a Fling (1938) as Maid (uncredited)
Slander House (1938) as Bessie, an attendant
There Goes My Heart (1938) as Mrs. Crud - Pennypepper's Patient (voice, uncredited)
The Storm (1938) as Woman on Bus (uncredited)
His Exciting Night (1938) as Carslake's Secretary (uncredited)
Federal Man-Hunt (1938) as Mock Funeral Participant (uncredited)
Made for Each Other (1939) as Johns Hopkins technician (uncredited)
Society Smugglers (1939) as Susan - Sully's Secretary
Sergeant Madden (1939) as Mrs. Daly (uncredited)
The Family Next Door (1939) as Secretary (uncredited)
The Story of Alexander Graham Bell (1939) as Piano Player (uncredited)
The Sun Never Sets  (1939) as Maid (uncredited)
Unexpected Father (1939) as Nurse (uncredited)
Good Girls Go to Paris (1939) as Ada - Brand's Maid (uncredited)
Stunt Pilot (1939) as Ethel
The Fighting Gringo (1939) as Sandra Courtney
When Tomorrow Comes (1939) as Waitress (uncredited)
Dancing Co-Ed (1939) as Miss May
Eternally Yours (1939) as Peabody's Housekeeper (uncredited)
Little Accident (1939) as Miss Wilson (uncredited)
Legion of the Lawless (1940) as Mrs. Barton
The Invisible Man Returns (1940) as Passerby at Willie's House (uncredited)
Convicted Woman (1940) as Gracie Dunn
I Take This Woman (1940) as Crazy Woman (scenes deleted)
Broadway Melody of 1940 (1940) as 2nd Bride (uncredited)
Ma! He's Making Eyes at Me (1940) as Girl Customer (uncredited)
My Son, My Son (1940) as First Maid
Three Faces West (1940) as Mrs. Stebbins (uncredited)
Girls of the Road (1940) as Mae
The Howards of Virginia (1940) as Susan Howard
Yesterday's Heroes (1940) as Librarian (uncredited)
The Ape (1940) as Mrs. Mason (uncredited)
The Trail Blazers (1940) as Alice Chapman
The Bank Dick (1940) as Woman (uncredited)
Charter Pilot (1940) as Secretary (uncredited)
Cheers for Miss Bishop (1941) as Mary, the Dressmaker (uncredited)
Golden Hoofs (1941) as Nellie (uncredited)
The Great Mr. Nobody (1941) as Miss Frame
Andy Hardy's Private Secretary (1941) as Lingerie Saleswoman (uncredited)
Shadows on the Stairs (1941) as Miss Snell
A Girl, a Guy, and a Gob (1941) as Woman on Street (uncredited)
Affectionately Yours (1941) as Mrs. Collins (uncredited)
Father Steps Out (1941) as Mrs. Benton, Farm Woman
Dr. Jekyll and Mr. Hyde (1941) as Wife (uncredited)
Wild Geese Calling (1941) as Jennie Delaney
One Foot in Heaven (1941) as Tallulah 'Lulu' Digby (uncredited)
Sea Raiders (1941, Serial) as Aggie Nelson
How Green Was My Valley (1941) as Eve (uncredited)
Ball of Fire (1941) as Miss Totten
Dr. Kildare's Victory (1942) as Ms. Nixon (uncredited)
Mexican Spitfire at Sea (1942) as Agnes, the Epping Maid (uncredited)
Mokey (1942) as Mrs. Graham
The Man Who Wouldn't Die (1942) as Maid (uncredited)
This Above All (1942) as Hotel Maid (uncredited)
Miss Annie Rooney (1942) as Mrs. Metz
Mrs. Miniver (1942) as Miss Spriggins (uncredited)
The Gay Sisters (1942) as Farmer's Granddaughter / Organist (uncredited)
Wake Island (1942) as Miss Pringle, Woman with Cynthia (uncredited)
Just Off Broadway (1942) as Maid (uncredited)
The Major and the Minor (1942) as Wilbur & Margie's Mother in Railroad Station (uncredited)
Get Hep to Love (1942) as Woman Judge (uncredited)
You Can't Escape Forever (1942) as Kirsty Lundstrom (uncredited)
Now, Voyager (1942) as Passenger (uncredited)
I Married a Witch (1942) as Nancy Wooley
You Were Never Lovelier (1942) as Louise - the Acuña Maid (uncredited)
Henry Aldrich Plays Cupid (1942) as Anxious (uncredited)
The Great Gildersleeve (1942) as Amelia Hooker
The Gorilla Man (1943) as Nurse Kruger
The Crystal Ball (1943) as Foster (uncredited)
Hello, Frisco, Hello (1943) as Ellie, Cockney Maid
Three Hearts for Julia (1943) as The Symphony Guild Secretary (uncredited)
Salute to the Marines (1943) as Mrs. Riggs (uncredited)
A Lady Takes a Chance (1943) as Florrie Bendix
Holy Matrimony (1943) as Oxford's Secretary (uncredited)
Princess O'Rourke (1943) as Clara Stilwell (uncredited)
Four Jills in a Jeep (1944) as Maid (scenes cut)
It Happened Tomorrow (1944) as Lizzie, Waitress at Restaurant (uncredited)
Henry Aldrich Plays Cupid (1944) as Anxious (uncredited)
Up in Mabel's Room (1944) as Priscilla's Sister (uncredited)
Once upon a Time (1944) as Taxi Girl (uncredited)
Mr. Skeffington (1944) as Mrs. Penelope Hyslup (uncredited)
Ladies of Washington (1944) as Nurse's Aide (uncredited)
Johnny Doesn't Live Here Anymore (1944) as Subscription Lady (uncredited)
Three Little Sisters (1944) as Carrie Higginbotham (uncredited)
The Port of 40 Thieves (1944) as Della
Frenchman's Creek (1944) as Prue (uncredited)
And Now Tomorrow (1944) as Nurse (uncredited)
Ministry of Fear (1944) as Martha Penteel (uncredited)
The Affairs of Susan (1945) as Nancy
The Unseen (1945) as Miss Budge (uncredited)
Wonder Man (1945) as Miss Hutchison - the Police Stenographer (uncredited)
Love Letters (1945) as Nurse in Italy (uncredited)
Because of Him (1946) as Maid (uncredited)
Little Giant (1946) as Secretary (uncredited)
Breakfast in Hollywood (1946) as Ms. Field (uncredited)
The Gentleman Misbehaves (1946) as Maid (uncredited)
Sentimental Journey (1946) as Chaperon (uncredited)
Talk About a Lady (1946) as Telephone Operator (uncredited)
House of Horrors (1946) as Nora, Switchboard Operator (uncredited)
Murder in the Music Hall (1946) as Waitress
The Dark Corner (1946) as Movie Theatre Cashier (uncredited)
One More Tomorrow (1946) as Maude Miller (uncredited)
The Walls Came Tumbling Down (1946) as Bradford's Secretary (uncredited)
Don't Gamble with Strangers (1946) as Mrs. Arnold
Rendezvous with Annie (1946) as Deborah
Mr. Ace (1946) as Lady with Question on Radio Forum (uncredited)
Black Angel (1946) as Mavis' Maid (uncredited)
Lady Luck (1946) as Miss Field - Thin Woman in Bookstore (uncredited)
Song of the South (1946) as Mrs. Favers
The Shocking Miss Pilgrim (1947) as Teacher (uncredited)
The Pilgrim Lady (1947) as Telephone Operator (uncredited) (aka Miss Pilgrim)
The Unfaithful (1947) as Miss Bryar - Hannaford's Receptionist (uncredited)
The Other Love (1947) as Nurse (uncredited)
The Corpse Came C.O.D. (1947) as Felice (uncredited)
Miracle on 34th Street (1947) as Dutch Girl's Adopted Mother (uncredited)
Welcome Stranger (1947) as Secretary
High Conquest (1947) as Miss Woodley
The Trouble with Women (1947) as Della (uncredited)
Life with Father (1947) as Nora
Dark Passage (1947) as Aunt Mary (uncredited)
Driftwood (1947) as Mrs. White (uncredited) 
Unconquered (1947) as Maggie
 Louisiana (1947) as Mrs. Davis
Her Husband's Affairs (1947) as Hortense, Mrs. Winterbottom's Maid (uncredited)
Where There's Life (1947) as Hotel Maid (uncredited)
Out of the Past (1947) as Marny - Diner Owner (uncredited)
If You Knew Susie (1948) as Telephone Operator (uncredited)
Sitting Pretty (1948) as Della - Book Shoppe Proprietress (uncredited)
The Fuller Brush Man (1948) as Beaver Patrol Leader (uncredited)
Up in Central Park (1948) as Miss Murch
Romance on the High Seas (1948) as Marie - Elvira's Maid (uncredited)
The Babe Ruth Story (1948) as Nurse (uncredited)
Mr. Peabody and the Mermaid (1948) as Wee Shop Clerk
Sorry, Wrong Number (1948) as Telephone Operator (uncredited)
A Song is Born (1948) as Miss Totten
Joan of Arc (1948) as Boy's Mother (uncredited)
One Sunday Afternoon (1948) as Barnstead's Secretary (uncredited)
Chicken Every Sunday (1949) as Miss Gilly (uncredited)
Henry, the Rainmaker (1949) as Mrs. Sweeney
A Connecticut Yankee in King Arthur's Court (1949) as Peasant Woman
Look for the Silver Lining (1949) as Rocky (uncredited)
You're My Everything (1949) as Record Store Clerk (uncredited)
Special Agent (1949) as Miss Tannehill - Librarian (uncredited)
Mighty Joe Young (1949) as O'Hara's Secretary (uncredited)
Mr. Soft Touch (1949) as Tenant (uncredited)
Top o' the Morning (1949) as Maid
Dear Wife (1949) as Mrs. Bixby
Paid in Full (1950) as Dr. Winston's Patient (uncredited)
Cheaper by the Dozen (1950) as Music Teacher (uncredited)
Father Makes Good (1950) as Mrs. Sweeney (uncredited)
Edge of Doom (1950) as Mary Jane Glennon
Let's Dance (1950) as Nurse (uncredited)
Dear Brat (1951) as File Clerk (uncredited)
Passage West (1951) as Miss Swingate
The Barefoot Mailman (1951) as Mrs. Thomas (uncredited)
The Greatest Show on Earth (1952) as Spectator (uncredited)
Monkey Business (1952, uncredited)
Something to Live For (1952, uncredited)
Anything Can Happen (1952) as Aunt Florence (uncredited)
The Lady Wants Mink (1953) as Janie
Champ for a Day (1953) as Ann - Healy's Receptionist (uncredited) 
Four Guns to the Border (1954) as Mrs. Pritchard
The Private War of Major Benson (1955) as Sister Mary Theresa
To Hell and Back (1955) as Mrs. Murphy
Lucy Gallant (1955) as Irma Wilson
Assignment: Mexico (1956, TV Movie) as Jane
The Price of Fear (1956) as Ruth McNab
The Toy Tiger (1956) as Miss Elsie
The Three Faces of Eve (1957) as Effie Blanford (uncredited)
The Missouri Traveler (1958) as Nelda Hamilton
Ride a Crooked Trail (1958) as Mrs. Curtis
Seven Ways from Sundown (1960) as Mrs. Karrington

References

External links 

 Mary Field's Official Website
 

1909 births
1996 deaths
Actresses from New York City
American film actresses
American television actresses
Religious Science
Actors from Fairfax, Virginia
20th-century American memoirists
20th-century American actresses
American adoptees
Actresses from Los Angeles
American women memoirists
20th-century American women writers
People from Laguna Niguel, California